Airedale is the valley of the River Aire in Yorkshire, England.

Airedale may also refer to

Airedale Terrier, a breed of dog
Places
Airedale, Castleford, a suburb of Castleford, West Yorkshire, England
Airedale, Kentucky, a community in the United States
People
Baron Airedale, a title in the British peerage
Transport
Airedale (automobile)
Beagle Airedale, a British aircraft developed in the 1960s
Blackburn Airedale, a British aircraft built in 1924
Airedale Line, a rail service
Other
Airedale Academy, a school in Castleford, West Yorkshire, England
Airedale General Hospital, West Yorkshire, England
Airedale NHS Foundation Trust, a National Health Service Hospital Trust in West Yorkshire